The Taube Tennis Center is an outdoor tennis facility on the west coast of the United States, located on the campus of Stanford University in Stanford, California.  In addition to hosting the Stanford Cardinal's men's and women's tennis teams, the 17-court facility was the home of the Bank of the West Classic between 1997 and 2017, a WTA Tour event.  The stadium court, Taube Family Tennis Stadium, has a seating capacity of 2,445 spectators.

The facility has hosted many tennis events, including the 1999 Fed Cup final, which saw the United States defeat Russia; four NCAA Women's Tennis Championships; and the first combined NCAA Women's and Men's Tennis Championships in 2006.

Since 2008, Taube has also been host to the annual USGO Gay/Lesbian tournament, held every Memorial Day weekend. See The Gay and Lesbian Tennis Alliance.

Opened  in 1926, the site was previously occupied by Stanford Field.

External links

Facility's page on GoStanford.com
Photo gallery
Fed Cup Final September 1999, USA vs Russia
Photo gallery 2
Wikimapia

Stanford University buildings and structures
Stanford Cardinal tennis
Tennis venues in California
Sports venues in Santa Clara County, California
1926 establishments in California
Sports venues completed in 1926